Carlo (also referred to as Carl Gustav) is an improvised submachine gun manufactured by small workshops in the Palestinian territories. The design was inspired by the Swedish Carl Gustav m/45 and its Egyptian Port Said variant, however the similarity is often only passing. The Carlo's homemade nature makes it affordable on the black market, where it is purchased not only by Palestinians targeting Israelis but also by Arab-Israeli gangs. The Carlo is cheap and requires little skill or equipment to manufacture, but it is inaccurate and prone to jamming and misfire. The weapon is named after the Carl Gustaf m/45.

The weapon has also become popular with criminal groups outside of Israel, including Croatia, Brazil, Chile, Ukraine, Italy, South America, the Caribbean and Australia and by Hamas's Izz ad-Din al-Qassam Brigades and Palestinian Islamic Jihad's Al-Quds Brigades.

Since October 1, 2016, the Carlo was reported to be used in 68 attacks.

History 
In 2000, the Carlo was first identified by Israeli Police officers, seen with Israeli-Arab gangs.

On June 17, 2014, the IDF was reported that a raid in Nablus by Yahalom commandos netted several Carloses in an arms cache.

On February 3, 2016, the Carlo was cited as the weapon used to shoot Israeli Border Police officer Hadar Cohen, which has some parts made from old pipes. On 8 June 2016 Tel Aviv shooting, two Palestinian gunmen opened fire on Tel Aviv's Sarona Market, killing four Israelis. At the time, the Carlos were reported to have jammed up after being used at short range.

The Carlo has been spotted on March 14, 2016, in an attack against Israeli troops in Hebron. Israeli law enforcement agencies, including Shin Bet, conducted raids on March 16, 2016, to crack down on underground gunsmith shops making the Carlo.

On July 14, 2017, three Arab-Israeli terrorists armed with Carlo submachine guns, opened fire on Temple Mount  murdering  two Israeli Druze policemen, Haiel Sitawe and Kamil Shnaan.

Design 

Produced in several locations via underground workshops and often with second-hand gun parts, the specifications are not uniform. Initially, it was made partially with scrapped pipes. Some more recent makes of the Carlo have been made with rifled barrels, raising the price from under $800 to nearly $4,000.

Most of the parts needed to make the Carlo in recent years are taken from lost/stolen M4-type rifles and magazines, taken from IDF training areas or by breaking into someone's house who has a M4-type rifle to be cannibalized. Others were made from rifle accessories that are easily purchased online, and some even incorporate parts of Airsoft or paintball rifles.

Often chambered for 9x19mm handgun cartridges, variants for .22 LR, .32 ACP, 9 x 18 mm, and 5.56 x 45 mm are also produced, but the presence of the latter is suggested to be impossible since samples of the weapon had 5.56 NATO magazines modified to house Uzi magazines or sometimes with pistol-based magazines. Some of them were made with M16-type pistol grips and Uzi-based 25-round magazines. One instance of a Carlo seized has a STANAG magazine used to hide a 9x19 Uzi or a homemade magazine. Others were based on the MP5 and the AK rifles. They can only fire in full auto in an open bolt with the ejection port on the left side and the charging handle on the right side.

The Carlo, made to be compact, was best used by being concealed on the left side of someone's clothes (usually jacket) with the right hand being used to draw it.

References 

Submachine guns
Palestinian inventions
Homemade firearms
Insurgency weapons
Arab inventions